Miguel Ángel "La Rana" Huertas del Águila (born 7 June 1977 in Trujillo) is a Peruvian footballer who plays as a right back for Alfonso Ugarte de Puno.

Club career
Huertas made his Torneo Descentralizado league debut in 2000 playing for Deportivo UPAO.

He then joined Peruvian giants Alianza Lima in January 2001. There he won his first silverware as Alianza finished as champions of the 2001 Descentralizado.

Honours

Club
Alianza Lima
Torneo Descentralizado (1): 2001
Cienciano
Clausura: 2006

References

1977 births
Living people
People from Trujillo, Peru
Association football fullbacks
Peruvian footballers
Club Alianza Lima footballers
Sport Coopsol Trujillo footballers
FBC Melgar footballers
Cienciano footballers
Club Deportivo Universidad César Vallejo footballers
Sport Huancayo footballers
Colegio Nacional Iquitos footballers
Peruvian Primera División players